The International Credit Insurance & Surety Association (ICISA) was founded in April 1928, forming the first trade credit insurance association. The Association is registered in Zurich (Switzerland) under Swiss Civil Code (article 60). The Secretariat is based in Amsterdam.

About ICISA 
The International Credit Insurance & Surety Association (ICISA) is a global association representing trade credit insurers and surety companies. ICISA members facilitate trade, by insuring payment risks resulting from local sales as well as exports, or by providing security for the performance of a contract. Members of ICISA meet regularly and benefit from an exchange of information and expertise.

ICISA has a role as advocacy and media relations organisation on issues and topics that are relevant for the members. ICISA advises international and multinational authorities on issues related to the trade credit insurance and surety bond industries.

Object of the association 
The object of the association is to study questions relating to credit insurance and surety, to provide opportunities for members' employees to acquire knowledge of the theory and practice of credit insurance and surety underwriting, and to represent the Members’ interests."

Some issues addressed by ICISA 
Technical excellence, innovation and product integrity.
 Review of the effects of cross-border insolvencies
 Recommendations with regard to binding orders and non-cancellable limits
 Report on issues concerning fronting for surety bonds
 Recommendations with regard to pre-shipment cover
 Review of political risk
 Syndication of credit risks
 The impact of globalisation on credit insurance
 Review of co-surety as an alternative to reinsurance
 Monitoring developments in custom and excise bonds
 Exploring areas for surety business
 Publication of the Catalogue of Credit Insurance Terminology

Promoting sustained quality management
 Discussions between members exchanging experience and best practices on current challenges
 Review of capital and portfolio management tools
 Review of cycle management options
 Review of the current and future reinsurance environment
 Review of co-insurance and facultative reinsurance options

Advising international and multinational authorities
 Sharing effects of the State Support Schemes
 Creating awareness at the European Commission of the lack of a level playing field for surety products
 Promoting a global level playing field for surety insurers in public contracts
 Counterpart for the Comité Européen des Assurances (CEA) in the drafting and implementation of Solvency II requirements
 Promoting the ICC uniform rules for contract guarantees
 Participating in meetings of the UN Commission on International Trade Law (UNCITRAL)
 Advising the International Accounting Standards Board (IASB) on their proposals with regard to the credit insurance and surety sectors
 Advising rating agencies on the role of surety bonds on PPI/PPP infra-structure projects
 Advising CEIOPS / European Commission on Solvency II proposed legislation
 Sharing and assessing the possible impact of Basel III on trade credit insurance and surety industry

Structural initiatives
 Founding member of the International Surety Association (ISA) which undertakes joint projects together with national surety associations of Australia, Canada, Mexico and the USA
 Partner in an industry project to determine the Probable Maximum Loss (PML) or Loss Given Default (LGD) of underwritten risks
 Research into standardising reinsurance requirements
 Press conference calls to inform media on topics of interest
 Publication of an industry newsletter
 Publishing ICISA Catalogue of trade credit insurance and surety (English, French, Italian, Spanish and German)

Members and their lines of business
Trade credit insurance
 Trade credit insurance insures against the risk of non-payment by a buyer. If a buyer does not pay, the trade credit insurance policy will pay out a percentage of the outstanding debt. This percentage usually ranges from 75% to 95% of the invoice amount, but may be higher or lower depending on the type of cover that was purchased.

Surety and bonds
 Surety bonds guarantee the performance of obligations, from construction or service contracts, to licensing, to commercial undertakings. The surety guarantees to pay the direct loss suffered by one party (generally employer or beneficiary) as a result of a contractual default by the other party (generally known as the contractor). For example, the failure of a contractor to complete a contract in accordance with its terms and specifications or the failure of an enterprise to pay taxes or customs duties to a government or department.

Members' main lines of surety business are:
 Customs, tax and/or similar bonds
 Bonds concerning concessions and licenses
 Judicial Bonds
 Bonds concerning purchases of goods and/or services
 Bonds concerning leases
 Bonds concerning construction and/or supply contracts
 Financial bonds
 Other bonds
 
Reinsurance
 A reinsurance company insures the risk that has been underwritten by an insurance company. The risk of a major loss event imposes a burden that no single company can bear. Reinsurance makes it possible for these risks to be underwritten. In a way, one could say, "reinsurance is insurance for insurance companies". Over the years the international reinsurance sector has developed into a highly specialised financial services industry that works closely in conjunction with direct insurers to meet the needs of their cursomers. ICISA's Reinsurance Members have departments focusing only on the reinsurance of credit insurance and surety risks.

History
ICISA was established as (ICIA) (International Credit Insurance Association) in 1928. Current members account for 95% of the world's private credit insurance business, insuring risks in most countries.

Founding members
 Cobac of Belgium (now Euler Hermes)
 Crédito y Caución (now part of Atradius Group)
 Eidgenössische of Switzerland (now Winterthur)
 Hermes of Germany (now Euler Hermes)
 NCM of the Netherlands (now Atradius)
 SFAC of France (now Euler Hermes)
 SIAC of Italy (now Euler Hermes)
 Trade Indemnity of the UK (now Euler Hermes).

Relevance 
 ICISA's members account for over 95% of the world's private credit insurance business.
 ICISA members insured over 2 trillion USD worth of trade worldwide.
 In 2012 the association counted 48 members.

References

External links 
  ICISA website

 

Organizations established in 1928
Credit
1928 establishments in Switzerland
Organisations based in Amsterdam